FCM Young Boys Diekirch is a football club, based in Diekirch, in north-eastern Luxembourg.

External links
 Young Boys Diekirch official website

Diekirch
Football clubs in Luxembourg